was a Japanese photographer.

References

Japanese photographers
1893 births
Year of death unknown